Pattee may refer to:

People
 David Pattee, Canadian businessman and judge
 Elizabeth Greenleaf Pattee, American landscape designer
 Erin Pattee, better known as Erin Brockovich
 Frank Pattee, American football halfback
 Fred Lewis Pattee, American author and scholar
 Harry Pattee, American baseball player
 Howard H. Pattee, American biology professor
 Pattee Byng, 2nd Viscount Torrington, British naval officer and statesman

Places
 Pattee Island in the Nunavut, Canada
 Pattee Hall, part of the University of Minnesota Old Campus Historic District
 Pattee Library of the Pennsylvania State University Libraries
 Pattee's Caves (also: Jonathan Pattee's Cave), an early name for the archaeological site now known as America's Stonehenge

Other
 Cross pattée (also cross pattee), a type of cross